Odirile Gaolebale (born 14 November 1978) is a retired Botswanan footballer. A goalkeeper, he played once for the Botswana national football team, replacing Phineas Maimela in the 26th minute of a 1-0 loss to Zambia in a World Cup qualifier on 22 April 2000.

References

External links
 

Association football goalkeepers
Botswana footballers
Botswana international footballers
1978 births
Living people
Botswana Defence Force XI F.C. players